H.M.S. Unseen is a naval thriller published in 1999 by Patrick Robinson; it is the third book in the series featuring Admiral Arnold Morgan, and marks the return of Ben Adnam. It is stylistically similar to Tom Clancy, particularly his The Hunt for Red October. The book differs from the previous two in the series in that it focuses less on the plot and heroes and spends more time on the character development of villain Ben Adnam.

Plot summary
As hinted at the end of Nimitz Class, Ben Adnam is alive and well. Having returned to Iraq, he is awarded a medal, but also suffers a betrayal. He flees Iraq and offers his services to Iran.  He devises a plan to cripple Transatlantic air travel. The plan first requires capturing HMS Unseen—the last of the "quietest subs in the world"—the Upholder class.  He combines this with a defunct missile system, and creates a weapon capable of knocking any aircraft out of the sky without detection.  The plan works perfectly and several aircraft, including "Air Force Three" carrying the Vice President, are destroyed. However, Ben is abandoned by the Iranians and so left to fend for himself.  He comes up with a scheme to meet the man who has hunted him for so long, Admiral Morgan, in order to offer his services to the US. During their confrontation, Adnam informs Morgan that Iraq was behind the terrorist attacks and suggests that the destruction of some dams in the country is sufficient retribution. The US destroy these dams and Baghdad ends up beneath four feet of water.

In the Epilogue, Ben Adnam, having been given a permanent job and a US passport, decides to come clean and inform Morgan that it was actually under the flag of Iran that he had destroyed the airlines. A furious Morgan terminates Adnam's employment but gives him the option of taking his own life, rather than have a SWAT team do it for him. With nowhere left to run, Adnam positions himself in the traditional east-facing position of Muslim prayer before shooting himself in the head.

Ben Adnam
Ben Adnam is somewhat unusual among techno thriller villains in that he is neither captured nor are any of his attacks thwarted by the "good guys"; even his death is at his own hands. This has led to claims that the books are actually a satire of the genre which often feature perfect heroes and despicable but one dimensional villains.

References

See also
State-sponsored terrorism

1999 novels
Techno-thriller novels
Novels about submarine warfare
Novels about terrorism
Century (imprint) books